Regional elections were held in the German-speaking Community of Belgium on 26 October 1986, to choose representatives for the Council of the German-speaking Community. They were the first elections to the Council after the German Cultural Community was changed into the German-speaking Community, with more autonomy, its own executive body, and elections that were held separately from the national legislative elections.

Following the election, the CSP and PFF formed a government led by Joseph Maraite.

Results

References

Regional elections in Belgium
Regional
Belgium